El faro (The Lighthouse) is a 1998 Argentine-Spanish drama film directed by Eduardo Mignogna. The film is also known in Spain as El faro del Sur.

The screenplay was a collaborative effort of Graciela Aguirre, José Antonio Félez, Eduardo Mignogna, and Santiago Carlos Oves. It features Ingrid Rubio, Jimena Barón, among others. The film won numerous awards including the Goya Awards for Best Foreign Film.

Cast

 Ingrid Rubio as Carmela (nicknamed Memé)
 Ricardo Darín as Andy
 Norma Aleandro as Dolores
 Norberto Díaz as Fernando
 Jorge Marrale as Miguel
 Boy Olmi as Richard
 Mariano Martínez as Javier
 Jimena Barón as Aneta as a child
 Florencia Bertotti as Aneta as a teen
 Ina Casares as Angelita
 Alejandra Aleano as Dolores
 Roberto Vallejos as Michi
 Oscar Ferrigno Jr. as Priest
 Elcira Olivera Garcés as Encarna
 Carmen Renard as Conserje
 Paola Krum as Sonia
 Mónica Lacoste as Dorita

Exhibition
The film opened wide in Argentina on April 16, 1998.  In Spain it opened on May 22, 1998. It was screened in the United States at the Miami Hispanic Film Festival, Miami, Florida.

Home media
The DVD (USA & territories, plus Canada) of El Faro was released on September 21, 2004 by Venevision.

Awards
Wins
 Montréal World Film Festival: Best Actress, Ingrid Rubio, Prize of the Ecumenical Jury, Eduardo Mignogna; 1998.
 Argentine Film Critics Association Awards: Silver Condor, Best Actress (Mejor Actriz), Ingrid Rubio; Best Director (Mejor Director), Eduardo Mignogna; Best New Actress (Mejor Revelación Femenina), Jimena Barón; 1999.
 Goya Awards: Goya, Best Spanish Language Foreign Film (Mejor Película Extranjera de Habla Hispana), Eduardo Mignogna, Argentina; 1999.
 Oslo Films from the South Festival: Audience Award, Eduardo Mignogna; 1999.

Nominations
 Butaca Awards, Barcelona, Spain: Butaca, Best Catalan Film Actress (Millor actriu catalana de cinema), Ingrid Rubio; 1998.
 Montréal World Film Festival: Grand Prix des Amériques, Eduardo Mignogna; 1998.
 Festróia - Tróia International Film Festival: Golden Dolphin, Eduardo Mignogna; 1999.
 Argentine Film Critics Association Awards: Silver Condor, Best Art Direction/Production Design (Mejor Dirección Artística/Escenografía), Abel Facello; Best Cinematography (Mejor Fotografía), Marcelo Camorino; Best Film (Mejor Película); Best Music (Mejor Música), Baby López Fürst; Best New Actress (Mejor Revelación Femenina), Florencia Bertotti; Best Screenplay, Original (Mejor Guión Original), Eduardo Mignogna, Santiago Carlos Oves, Graciela Aguirre, and José Antonio Félez; 1999.

References

External links
 
 El faro at the cinenacional.com 
  

1998 films
1998 drama films
1998 independent films
Argentine independent films
1990s Spanish-language films
Spanish independent films
Films about sisters
Films set in Uruguay
Works set in lighthouses
Films shot in Colonia del Sacramento